Our Constant Concern is the second album by American indie pop duo Mates of State. Released on January 22, 2002, it was the first of two albums released under Polyvinyl Records.

Critical reception

Mackenzie Wilson of AllMusic called it a "stunning follow-up to 2000's My Solo Project," praising the duo's mixture of "sugary pop hooks" and "deep lyrical conversations" through "young but charming" harmonies, concluding "[T]heir relationship is their musical storybook and Our Constant Concern playfully suggests that love can really be beautiful." Pitchfork writer Rob Mitchum was disappointed with the album, noting the slow tempo of the material, heavy use of non-distorted organ effects, and the duo's harmonies being "far less eccentric and less vibrant" compared to their first effort. Despite giving praise to "Quit Doin' It" and "Halves and Have-Nots", he wrote "these brief flashes, even on a thirty-minute album, do little to keep the dreaded sophomore slump virus from hitting Our Constant Concern."

Track listing

References

 

2002 albums
Mates of State albums
Polyvinyl Record Co. albums